Miagliano is a comune (municipality) in the Province of Biella in the Italian region Piedmont, located about  northeast of Turin and about  northeast of Biella.

Miagliano borders the following municipalities: Andorno Micca, Sagliano Micca.

Demographic evolution

References

Cities and towns in Piedmont